Travis Bell may refer to:

Travis Bell (born 1978), Canadian ice hockey play who was named to the 2003 ECAC Hockey All-Tournament Team
Travis Bell, a character in Killer7
Travis Bell, American football playerm see 2007 Miami Hurricanes football team